Elias Jelert Kristensen (born 12 June 2003) is a Danish professional footballer who plays as a right-back at Copenhagen.

Club career
Jelert began playing football at the youth academy of Virum-Sorgenfri Boldklub in 2008, and moved to Copenhagen's academy in 2014. He signed his first professional contract with the club on 11 August 2021. He made his professional debut with Copenhagen in a 1–1 Danish Superliga tie with SønderjyskE on 17 October 2021.

Club

International career 
Jelert played four games with the Denmark U19 national team.

Honours
Copenhagen
 Danish Superliga: 2021–22

References

External links
 
 

Living people
2003 births
People from Lyngby-Taarbæk Municipality
Sportspeople from the Capital Region of Denmark
Danish men's footballers
Association football fullbacks
Denmark youth international footballers
Danish Superliga players
F.C. Copenhagen players